Aspropyrgos Football Club is a Greek professional football club based in Aspropyrgos, Athens, Greece.

History
The club was founded in 1995 with the merger of the older clubs "Panaspropyrgiakos" ["Πανασπροπυργιακός"] (founded in 1947 from the union of all of the city's teams and from 1951 participated in Piraeus FCA championships) and Doxa Aspropyrgos, with the name Enosis Aspropyrgos.

In 2009, it was promoted to Football League 2 (Greece). Enosis participated at Delta Ethniki in the 2008–09 season and finished in 1st place of 7th group before promoted to Football League 2.

Before the merger in the 1977-78 Greek football season, the team defeated Doxa Megalopoli 1–0 in a draw in the Greek Amateur Cup which was held in Tavros southwest of Athens.

In its career, the team headed to the finals of the Greek Amateur Cup where it lost the cup to Volida Corfu in the 2008–09 season. The following season, participated in the Hellas Online Cup and defeated Aia Salamis (3–1), Diagoras Rhodes (1–1, 5–3 in penalty kicks) and Ethnikos Asteras (2–1). Enosis was defeated by Aris 3–4.

Players

Current squad

References

 
Football clubs in Attica
Association football clubs established in 1995
1995 establishments in Greece